The name Fay or Faye has been used for 22 tropical cyclones worldwide: 5 in the Atlantic Ocean; 1 in the Australian region; 1 in the South Pacific Ocean; and 15 in the Western Pacific Ocean. 

In the Atlantic:

 Hurricane Faye (1975), a Category 2 hurricane that had minor effects in Bermuda
 Tropical Storm Fay (2002), a tropical storm that caused minor damage in Texas and northern Mexico
 Tropical Storm Fay (2008), a near hurricane strength tropical storm that made landfall in Florida four times, the first known storm in history to do so
 Hurricane Fay (2014), a Category 1 hurricane that affected Bermuda
 Tropical Storm Fay (2020), a moderate tropical storm that affected New Jersey, earliest sixth named storm in the Atlantic basin

In the Australian region:

 Cyclone Fay, a Category 5 storm (Category 4 on the Saffir-Simpson scale) that made landfall in Western Australia; name retired afterward

In the South Pacific:

 Tropical Cyclone Fay (1978), affected Fiji

In the Western Pacific:

 Typhoon Faye (1949)
 Tropical Storm Faye (1952)
 Typhoon Faye (1957)
 Typhoon Faye (1960)
 Typhoon Faye (1963) 
 Typhoon Faye (1965) 
 Typhoon Faye (1968) 
 Typhoon Faye (1971) 
 Tropical Storm Faye (1974) 
 Typhoon Faye (1978)
 Typhoon Faye (1982)
 Typhoon Faye (1985)
 Tropical Storm Faye (1989)
 Tropical Storm Faye (1992)
 Typhoon Faye (1995)

Atlantic hurricane set index articles
Australian region cyclone set index articles
South Pacific cyclone set index articles